"Wannabe" is a song that was recorded by South Korean girl group Itzy and released on their second extended play (EP) titled It'z Me.  JYP Entertainment released the song as the EP's lead single on March 9, 2020. It was written and produced by Galactika, who also produced the band's debut track "Dalla Dalla". The song combines house and hip-hop/pop production, and bubblegum-pop melodies.

"Wannabe" received generally favorable reviews from music critics. It was a commercial success, charting in eight countries and debuting at number six on the Gaon Digital Chart in their native country. It topped the charts in Malaysia and Singapore, becoming their first number-one song on both charts and peaking at number two on the K-pop Hot 100.

Naive Creative Production directed the song's accompanying music video, which was uploaded onto JYP's YouTube channel simultaneously with the single's release. Within 24 hours, the music video accumulated over 11 million views and has, as of December 2021, accumulated more than 400 million views, making it their most-viewed music video on the platform. Following the release of It'z Me, Itzy promoted the song with live performances on several South Korean music television programs and amassed eight music show trophies.

Background and release 
On February 19, 2020, a teaser confirming Itzy would be having a comeback on March 9 with their second EP It'z Me was released. On February 21 another teaser image was posted on the group's official social media, confirming the EP's lead single would be "Wannabe". Individual teasers for each member were released between February 24 and 28. On March 2,  JYP Entertainment released a short, instrumental film of the song. More teaser images were posted for the next two days. Two teasers for the music video were released on March 5 and 6.

JYP Entertainment released "Wannabe" and its music video for digital download and streaming on March 9, 2020, as the lead single from It'z Me. On January 22, 2021, Itzy released their first English-language EP Not Shy, which includes the English version of "Wannabe".

The Japanese version of "Wannabe" was released as digital single on November 1, 2021. The Japanese lyrics were written by Yohei.

Composition 

"Wannabe" was written and produced by music production team Galactika, who also produced the band's debut track "Dalla Dalla". "Wannabe" combines house and hip-hop/pop production, and bubblegum-pop melodies; the lyrics stress the importance of personal identity and individuality. The song is composed in the key of F♯ minor; it has an average tempo of 122 beats per minute and runs for three minutes and eleven seconds. The members of the group said the song "delivers a message that 'I am precious as I am'".

Critical reception 
"Wannabe" was met with generally positive reviews from music critics. J.M.K. of Billboard said Itzy's "brand of girl crush is less the confident scoff of BLACKPINK's 'Look at you, now look at me' and more 'Look to me, now look at you!'" and that the single "invite[s] us again to dance, gilding a shapeshifting electro-pop beat and 2000s guitar-pop chugs with whimsical flourishes".

Taylor Glasby from Dazed ranked the song at number 17 on "The 40 best K-pop songs of 2020", writing the song "joins the self-confident canon of 'Icy' and 'Dalla Dalla' but its refrain of 'I don't wanna be somebody, I wanna be me, me, me' combines youthful impatience with a universal frustration at hiding oneself, giving them their most instantly sticky and durable hit yet".

Music video and promotion 
The music video for "Wannabe" was released on March 9, 2020, along with the EP. The video was directed by Naive Creative Production, who also directed the videos for "Dalla Dalla" and "Icy". As of December 2021, the video had had over 400 million views and 5.3 million likes on YouTube, and was ranked sixth on 2020 YouTube's Most Popular Music Video in South Korea. On March 15, the dance practice video for "Wannabe" was released on Itzy's official YouTube channel.

To mark the EP's release, Itzy held a live broadcast on V Live, in which they also performed the full choreography of the song for the first time. The group promoted "Wannabe" on several South Korean television shows, including M Countdown, Music Bank, Show! Music Core, and Inkigayo, between March 12 and April 6.

Commercial performance 
"Wannabe" debuted at number six on the Gaon Digital Chart, giving the group their third top-ten song. The song debuted at number four on the US World Digital Song Sales chart. It was the group's first top-five entry since "Dalla Dalla" and their third top-ten entry overall. In New Zealand, the song peaked at number 22 on the Hot Singles chart. In Japan, it debuted and peaked at number 23, making it their highest peak on that chart. "Wannabe" was the group's debut on the Canadian Hot 100 at number 92, becoming only the sixth female K-pop act to appear on the chart after CL, Red Velvet, Blackpink, Jennie and Twice. "Wannabe" topped the charts in Malaysia and Singapore, becoming their first number-one song on both charts.

Credits and personnel 
Credits adapted from NetEase Music.

 Itzy — primary vocals
 Woobin — composition, drums, keyboard
 GALACTIKA * — arrangement
 FRIDAY. (GALACTIKA *) — background vocals
 e.NA — background vocals
 CHANG (GALACTIKA *) — drums, bass, keyboard
 ATHENA (GALACTIKA *) — keyboards
 Kim Park Chella — guitar, bass
 War of Stars * (GALACTIKA *) - songwriting, composition, background vocals recording
 HONZO — digital editing
 Lee Tae-seop — mixer
 Chris Gehringer — mastering

Accolades 
Itzy received their second Digital Bonsang award at the 35th Golden Disc Awards, which they previously achieved with "Dalla Dalla". "Wannabe" was also nominated for a Digital Daesang. At the Mnet Asian Music Awards the song was nominated for Best Dance Performance and Song of the Year. "Wannabe" also received eight music-show wins, including a triple crown on M Countdown and Inkigayo, and a double crown on Show Champion.

Charts

Weekly charts

Monthly charts

Year-end charts

Certifications and sales

Release history

See also 
 List of Inkigayo Chart winners (2020)
 List of K-pop songs on the Billboard charts
 List of M Countdown Chart winners (2020)
 List of number-one songs of 2020 (Malaysia)
 List of number-one songs of 2020 (Singapore)

Notes

References 

Itzy songs
2020 singles
2020 songs
Acid house songs
JYP Entertainment singles
Number-one singles in Malaysia
Number-one singles in Singapore
Bubblegum pop songs